Unnikulam  is a Gram Panchayat in Kozhikode district in the state of Kerala, India. It is further divided into two revenue villages, Unnikulam and Shivapuram.Unnikulam Online is the First Online News Portal From Unnikulam And second news portal is [Unnikulam News]. Important small towns in this Panchayat are Ekarool, the capital town and Poonoor  . State Highway 34 (Kerala) passes through the Panchayat, connecting these two towns.

Demographics
 India census, Unnikulam had a population of 40229 with 20254 males and 19975 females.

Schools
 Ishaath Public School

See also
Neroth, Kozhikode

References

External links
http://www.unnikulamonline.com/history/

Gram panchayats in Kozhikode district